The Ramblin' Man is an album by American country music artist Waylon Jennings, released on RCA Victor in 1974.

Recording and composition
With a slightly more commercial sound than some of his recent records, The Ramblin' Man remained true to Jennings' outlaw country image and uncompromising musical vision.  The album was released at what was still considered to be the height of the outlaw movement in country music, and this was reflected in its chart success, with the LP peaking at #3 on the country charts, Jennings best showing since Love of the Common People in 1967.  Jennings produced it himself, although Ray Pennington co-produced "Oklahoma Sunshine" and "I'm a Ramblin' Man," the latter of which he also wrote.  Pennington recorded "I'm a Ramblin' Man" in 1967 for Capitol Records and took it to #29 on the country charts.  Jennings' version would be his second #1 on the country chart and also appeared on Australian charts.  "Rainy Day Woman" was released in December 1974 as the second single from the album and reached  #2 on the Billboard Hot Country Singles & Tracks chart.  Curiously, the Bob McDill ballad "Amanda" was not released as a single at this time; more than 4½ years later, new overdubs were added to the original track and placed on his first greatest hits album.  The song was issued as a single and it became one of the biggest country hits of 1979.

The album also includes a gutsy cover of the Allman Brothers' "Midnight Rider," cementing Jennings' fearless reputation as a leader of the "progressive" country sound.  The photo on the album cover was shot at Muhlenbrink's (formerly the Red Dog Saloon).

Reception
AllMusic: "If he had created a sketch of outlaw on Honky Tonk Heroes, he perfected the marketable version of it here, making it a little slicker, a little more commercial, and a whole lot more unstoppable. If the songs aren't the equal of Honky Tonk Heroes or even This Time, The Ramblin' Man has a wilder sound and a greater diversity of songs that make it seem more unruly than its immediate predecessor and more blatantly outlaw...There are moments of reflection, yet even those feed into the outlaw picture."

Track listing
"I'm a Ramblin' Man" (Ramon "Ray" Pennington) – 2:49
"Rainy Day Woman" (Jennings) – 2:31
"Cloudy Days" (Billy Ray Reynolds) – 2:41
"Midnight Rider" (Gregg Allman) – 3:24
"Oklahoma Sunshine" (Hal Bynum, Bud Reneau) – 3:29
"The Hunger" (Lee Fry) – 3:31
"I Can't Keep My Hands Off of You" (Bobby Borchers, Mack Vickery) – 3:38
"Memories of You and I" (Lee Clayton) – 4:16
"It'll Be Her" (Reynolds) – 3:03
"Amanda" (Bob McDill) – 2:56

Bonus tracks
"Got a Lot Going for Me" (Dave Kirby) – 2:32
"The Last Letter" (Rex Griffin) – 4:07
"The One I Sing My Love Song To" (Wayland Holyfield) – 2:49

Personnel
Waylon Jennings - guitar, vocals
Joe Allen - bass guitar
Leon Rhodes - bass guitar
Larrie Londin - drums 
Richie Albright - drums
Larry Whitmore - rhythm guitar
Dave Kirby - electric guitar 
Thomas Jackson - fiddle 
Alfred Newell - guitar
Billy Ray Reynolds - guitar
Kyle Lehning - piano, engineer
Bunky Keels - piano
Carl Gay - guitar
Duke Goff - guitar
Randy Scruggs - guitar
John W. Wilkin - guitar
Roger Crabtree - harmonica 
David Roys - engineer (Technician)
Herb Burnette - art direction
Bob Jones - photography
Ray Pennington - producer
Ray Pachucki - engineer
Bobby Thompson - rhythm guitar 
Ralph Mooney - steel guitar

References

Waylon Jennings albums
1974 albums
RCA Records albums
Buddah Records albums